Arthur James Powys Woodhouse known as Jim (20 October 1933 – 19 April 2014) was an English cricketer. Woodhouse was a right-handed batsman who bowled right-arm medium. He was born at Sidcup, Kent.

Educated at Oundle School, Woodhouse later made a single first-class appearance for the Free Foresters against Oxford University at the University Parks in 1957. Oxford University won the toss and elected to bat first, making 347/6 declared, during which Woodhouse bowled three overs and took the wicket of Richard Jowett. In the Free Foresters first-innings response of 146 all out, he scored 12 runs before being dismissed by Jowett, while in their second-innings the same bowler dismissed him for 17. Oxford University won the match by 187 runs.

He later became a company director.

References

External links
Arthur Woodhouse at ESPNcricinfo
Arthur Woodhouse at CricketArchive

1933 births
2014 deaths
People from Sidcup
People educated at Oundle School
English cricketers
Free Foresters cricketers